Sid Robinson may refer to:

 Stanley L. Robinson (1890–1967), American football player and coach, also known as Sid
 Sid Robinson (athlete) (1902–1982), American middle-distance runner